K Blows Top: A Cold War Comic Interlude, Starring Nikita Khrushchev, America's Most Unlikely Tourist (2009) is a book by Peter Carlson published by PublicAffairs describing the 1959 visit of Nikita Khrushchev to the United States.

Synopsis 
The book covers Nikita Khrushchev's visit to the United States, which took him to New York City, Los Angeles, San Francisco, Iowa, Pittsburgh, Pennsylvania, and Washington, D.C., and included visits to 20th Century Fox, the Mark Hopkins Hotel, an Iowa farm, a Pittsburgh steel mill, and Camp David. Highlights included meeting Shirley MacLaine and Frank Sinatra on the set of Can-Can, visiting a Quality Foods supermarket in San Francisco, and meeting Harry Bridges, fiery labor leader, movie star Marilyn Monroe, and hostess Perle Mesta, among many other Americans, famous and not-so-famous.

The title comes from a New York Times headline about Khrushchev's reaction when he was refused admission to Disneyland.

Film adaptation
In 2013, the story was in pre-production as a made-for-television movie to be produced by Tom Hanks and starring Paul Giamatti.

References

External links
 K Blows Top at PublicAffairs
 Review in The Washington Post (June 8, 2009)
 Carlson interviewed by Sergei Khrushchev about K Blows Top on C-SPAN's After Words, August 31, 2009

2009 non-fiction books
Books about the Cold War
Nikita Khrushchev
PublicAffairs books